Bye Bye Love is a 1995 American romantic comedy film that deals with the central issue of divorce. It was directed by Sam Weisman and written by Gary David Goldberg and Brad Hall. It stars Matthew Modine, Randy Quaid, Paul Reiser, Janeane Garofalo, Amy Brenneman, Eliza Dushku, Rob Reiner, Amber Benson, and Lindsay Crouse. Production costs were heavily underwritten by McDonald's product placement.
 
Goldberg and Hall stated that they included in the script several fictionalized accounts of events that had happened to divorced friends of theirs. Also acting in the film were Jayne Brook, and Ed Flanders in his last movie role.

Plot

This is a story about the breakup of the family. In particular, it focuses on the lifestyle of three divorced men in the Los Angeles area, Dave Goldman (Matthew Modine), wrestling coach/driver's ed teacher Vic D'Amico (Randy Quaid), and real estate agent Donny Carson (Paul Reiser).

The film is presented from their perspective and it reveals their relationships with their children, former wives, girlfriends, male friendships, and their identities as divorced men. In addition to dealing with divorce, the film touches on spousal loss and young adult homelessness.

Cast
 Matthew Modine as Dave Goldman
 Randy Quaid as Vic D'Amico
 Paul Reiser as Donny Carson
 Janeane Garofalo as Lucille
 Rob Reiner as Dr. David Townsend
 Amy Brenneman as Susan (formerly Goldman)
 Ross Malinger as Ben Goldman
 Dana Wheeler Nicholson as Heidi Schmidt
 Mae Whitman as Michelle Goldman
 Lindsay Crouse as Grace (formerly D'Amico)
 Amber Benson as Meg D'Amico
 Cameron Boyd as Jed D'Amico
 Jayne Brook as Claire Carson
 Eliza Dushku as Emma Carson
 Johnny Whitworth as Max Cooper
 Maria Pitillo as Kim
 Brad Hall as Phil
 Ed Flanders as Walter Sims
 Wendell Pierce as Hector
 Danny Masterson as Mikey
 Jack Black as DJ at party
 Stephen Root (uncredited) as Awakening neighbor
 Michael Spound as Mike

Reception

The film grossed $12.1 million in the U.S. in its theatrical run. It has an 18% rating on Rotten Tomatoes based on 22 reviews. Janeane Garofalo's performance as the "date from hell" got good reviews, and earned her a nomination for an American Comedy Award. Many of the reviews complained that the movie played more like an episode of a sitcom than a feature film.

It was released on DVD on March 8, 2005 through Anchor Bay Entertainment.

Soundtrack
The film's soundtrack includes performances by Linda Ronstadt, The Proclaimers, Mary Chapin Carpenter, Ben Taylor, Everly Brothers, and Jackson Browne. It was released on March 14, 1995 through Giant Records.

Track listing

References

External links
 
 
 
 

1995 films
1990s English-language films
1995 romantic comedy films
20th Century Fox films
American romantic comedy films
Films about divorce
Films directed by Sam Weisman
Films scored by J. A. C. Redford
Films with screenplays by Gary David Goldberg
1990s American films